Bembo is a serif typeface.

Bembo may also refer to:

People 
Bembo (family), a Venetian noble family
Bernardo Bembo (14331519), Italian humanist and statesman
Pietro Bembo (14701547), Italian scholar, poet, and cardinal
Giovanni Bembo (15431618), Doge of Venice
Antonia Bembo, Italian singer and composer
Giovanni Francesco Bembo (fl. 1515 – 1543), Italian painter

Buildings 
Palazzo Bembo, a place in Venice